Yankuba Jarju (born 20 August 1996) is a Gambian professional footballer who plays as a forward for Championnat National club Cholet.

Club career
Jarju started his career in his native Gambia, with Real Banjul, before spending a season with Génération Foot in Senegal. He arrived in France in the summer of 2018, initially on loan with Pau FC, but on a permanent contract from the summer of 2019. He was part of the side that gained promotion to Ligue 2 in 2020, but did not establish himself at that level, and moved to SO Cholet in January 2021.

International career
Jarju made his professional debut with the Gambia national football team in a 0-0 2018 African Nations Championship qualifying tie on 15 July 2017.

References

External links
 
 

1996 births
Living people
Gambian footballers
The Gambia international footballers
Pau FC players
Real de Banjul FC players
SO Cholet players
Ligue 2 players
Championnat National players
Senegal Premier League players
Association football forwards
Gambian expatriate footballers
Expatriate footballers in France
Expatriate footballers in Senegal